IF Göta is a sports club in Karlstad, Sweden, founded in 1904. The club used to have a successful team in bandy, becoming Swedish champions six times, but now is only concentrated on athletics. The bandy department was merged with IF Boltic to form BS BolticGöta.

The club is sometimes unofficially called IF Karlstad-Göta to avoid confusion with the Stockholm based sports club IK Göta.

History
In the first year of bandy league system in Sweden, 1930–31, Göta entered in Division 1 Södra together with
Djurgårdens IF, IFK Strängnäs, IFK Uppsala, IK Göta, Linköpings AIK, Nässjö IF, and Örebro SK and finished 1st.

Honours

Domestic
 Swedish Champions:
 Winners (6): 1925, 1928, 1929, 1932, 1935, 1937
 Runners-up (5): 1919, 1931, 1933, 1952, 1967

References

1904 establishments in Sweden
Defunct bandy clubs in Sweden
Bandy clubs established in 1904
Sport in Karlstad
Athletics clubs in Sweden